Lititz Moravian Historic District is a national historic district located at Lititz, Lancaster County, Pennsylvania. The district includes 113 contributing buildings, 1 contributing site, and 2 contributing structures in Lititz.  It has notable examples of the Federal and Late Victorian architectural styles.  The buildings date from about 1755 to 1930.  Notable buildings include the Warden's House (c. 1757), Corpse House (Leichen Kappelchen) (1786), Werner House, Tinsley Cottage, Sisters' House (1758), Moravian Church (1787), Brothers' House (1759), Lititz National Bank, Commonwealth National Bank (1922), Mary Dixon Memorial Chapel (1884) on the campus of Linden Hall School, and General Sutter Inn (originally the Zum Anker, established 1764).

The contributing site is the Moravian Church Cemetery (established 1758). Among other notables, the cemetery contains the graves of General John Augustus Sutter, of California Gold Rush fame, and his wife Anna Dubeld Sutter, and Francis Florentine Hagen, composer of the beloved Christmas hymn "Morning Star, O Cheering Sight." Located in the district are the separately listed Congregational Store, Sturgis Pretzel House, and Johann Agust Sutter House.

It was listed on the National Register of Historic Places in 1986.

Gallery

References

Lititz, Pennsylvania
Historic districts on the National Register of Historic Places in Pennsylvania
Federal architecture in Pennsylvania
Historic districts in Lancaster County, Pennsylvania
Moravian settlement in Pennsylvania
National Register of Historic Places in Lancaster County, Pennsylvania